Deborah Schöneborn (born 13 March 1994) is a German long-distance runner. She competed in the women's marathon at the 2020 Summer Olympics held in Tokyo, Japan.

She competed in the women's half marathon at the 2019 Summer Universiade held in Naples, Italy. She finished in 4th place.

In 2020, she competed in the women's half marathon at the World Athletics Half Marathon Championships held in Gdynia, Poland.

Personal life 

Her twin sister Rabea Schöneborn is also a long-distance runner.

References

External links 
 

Living people
1994 births
Place of birth missing (living people)
German female long-distance runners
Competitors at the 2019 Summer Universiade
Twin sportspeople
German twins
Athletes (track and field) at the 2020 Summer Olympics
Olympic athletes of Germany
20th-century German women
21st-century German women